The 2021–22 BC Žalgiris season is the 78th season in the existence of the club. The club has been playing in the Betsafe-LKL, King Mindaugas Cup and the EuroLeague. Coach Martin Schiller, who served as the team's head coach the previous season, was shortly after the season began replaced by Jure Zdovc in October 2021. He was then replaced by Kazys Maksvytis in early April after losing twice in a row in LKL and finishing last in Euroleague.

Overview 
In January 2021, The Lithuanian champions have reached a contract extension agreement with big man Joffrey Lauvergne, who has signed a 1+1 deal until the end of the 2022–23 season.

Right after the Betsafe-LKL Finals series was over, Žalgiris immediately started setting the stones for next season, extending a contract with point guard Lukas Lekavičius on a 1+1 deal.

Players

Depth chart

Transactions

Players in

|}

Players out

|}

Players out on loan

|}

Club

Technical staff 

Source:

Staff transactions

In

Out

Pre-season games

Competitions

Overview

Betsafe-LKL

Regular season

Results summary

Results by round

Matches

Playoffs

EuroLeague

Regular season

Results summary

Results by round

Matches

Individual awards

References

External links
 BC Žalgiris official website
 BC Žalgiris at the Betsafe-LKL
 BC Žalgiris at the EuroLeague

BC Žalgiris
Kauno Žalgiris
Kauno Žalgiris